Denverton may refer to:

 Denverton, California, near Scandia, Solano County, California, US
 Denverton, in the List of Intel CPU microarchitectures